Lamberto Dini CGMG (born 1 March 1931) is an Italian politician and economist. He was the Director General of Bank of Italy from 1979 to 1994, Minister of Treasury from 1994 to 1996, the 51st Prime Minister of Italy from 1995 to 1996, and Foreign Minister from 1996 to 2001.

Early life and career 
After studying Economics in his native city of Florence, Dini took up a post at the International Monetary Fund in 1959, where he worked his way up until he served as Executive Director for Italy, Greece, Portugal and Malta between 1976 and 1979. Then, in October 1979, he moved to the Banca d'Italia, where he served as an executive until May 1994. When the Governor of the Bank of Italy, Carlo Azeglio Ciampi, with whom Dini had developed a rivalry, was called upon to serve as Prime Minister in April 1993, Dini was widely tipped to succeed him, but was passed over (allegedly on Ciampi's instigation) in favour of Antonio Fazio.

Dini made a comeback when Silvio Berlusconi formed the Berlusconi I Cabinet in May 1994, in which Dini served as Treasury Minister. Due to a split between Berlusconi and his coalition partner Umberto Bossi, the Lega Nord leader, Berlusconi's government collapsed in December 1994, after a mere seven months in power. In January 1995, Dini was appointed as Prime Minister by President Oscar Luigi Scalfaro. Dini also took the portfolio for treasury in the cabinet and was a non-elected prime minister and minister. Though he was not noted as a left-winger, he was given the confidence vote of the left-wing parties (apart from the Communist Refoundation Party) and by Lega Nord, whereas his erstwhile partners in the right-wing government chose to abstain whilst citing benevolence. His cabinet was a technocratic one.

The Olive Tree 
In April 1996, a general election was called, in which Berlusconi's House of Freedoms coalition, minus the Lega Nord, was pitted against that of Romano Prodi, The Olive Tree. Relations between Dini and Berlusconi had seriously soured by then, and Dini chose to join The Olive Tree with his own centrist party, Italian Renewal. Dini was elected to the Italian Chamber of Deputies, and served for the entire term as Minister of Foreign Affairs in four successive centre-left governments, under Prodi, Massimo D'Alema in two separate, successive cabinets, and finally Giuliano Amato.

His party has merged into The Daisy, a larger party formed out of several centrist parties belonging to the centre-left coalition. The May 2001 the general election was won by Berlusconi and his allies (including, once again, Lega Nord), which led to Berlusconi forming his second government in June. Dini was elected to the Italian Senate, and, in this capacity, served as a delegate to the Convention in charge of drafting the European Constitution (February 2002 – July 2003).

The People of Freedom 
In September 2007, a month before Democracy is Freedom – The Daisy merged with the Democrats of the Left to form the new big tent centre-left Democratic Party, Dini broke away from The Daisy to form the Liberal Democrats, a new incarnation of Italian Renewal.
As the protagonist of the defeat of the government of Prime Minister Romano Prodi in a January 2008 Senate vote, in view of the 2008 Italian general election Dini joined The People of Freedom, the newly created Italian liberal-conservative party led by Silvio Berlusconi.

Honours
In 2000 during a state visit to the United Kingdom he was awarded an honorary Knighthood Grand Cross of the Most Distinguished Order of St Michael and St George. On 29 April 2009, the Japanese government announced that it awarded Dini the Grand Cordon of the Order of the Rising Sun; the honour was presented to him by the Emperor and the Japanese Prime Minister in a formal ceremony in May 2009.

Foreign honours 
: 
  Honorary Knight Grand Cross of the Most Distinguished Order of St Michael and St George (2000).

References

|-

|-

|-

|-

 
|-

1931 births
Living people
Politicians from Florence
Independent politicians in Italy
Italian Renewal politicians
Democracy is Freedom – The Daisy politicians
Liberal Democrats (Italy) politicians
Prime Ministers of Italy
Foreign ministers of Italy
Italian Ministers of Justice
Deputies of Legislature XIII of Italy
Senators of Legislature XIV of Italy
Senators of Legislature XV of Italy
Senators of Legislature XVI of Italy
Italian economists
University of Michigan alumni
Honorary Knights Grand Cross of the Order of St Michael and St George